Bóbr or Bobr is a surname literally meaning "beaver" in Polish and Russian languages. Notable people with this surname include:
Kamila Bobr (born 1997), Belarusian sprint canoeist.
Stanisław Bóbr-Tylingo (1919–2001), Polish-born historian and  Polish resistance fighter 
 (1889-1959), Polish physicist and seismologist

See also

Bober (surname)

Surnames from nicknames